"Perfect" is the fourth and final single released from Canadian rock band Simple Plan's debut album, No Pads, No Helmets...Just Balls (2002). It became a top-40 hit in the band's native Canada as well as in Australia, New Zealand, and the United States. The song's B-side, "Happy Together", is a cover of the 1967 Turtles song.

Background and composition
"Perfect" was written by the band with music composer Arnold Lanni. Regarding the lyric "Hey dad, look at me" and "I'm sorry I can't be perfect". Drummer Chuck Comeau stated that this song "is his idea", to tell his parents that he is not perfect, he cannot be perfect because Comeau's parents were not supportive of his career choice, so in the song Comeau tells that he made it and he is not perfect and he cannot be perfect. Bassist and backing vocalist David Desrosiers also stated that this song was "about him" before he starts an acoustic version of the song. In another song of Simple Plan titled "Problem Child" (also sequel-alike for Perfect) from their fifth studio album Taking One for the Team (2016), Comeau stated that "Problem Child" is "a part 2 of Perfect". Comeau also stated that this song is about his brother who supports him in his music career.

Chart performance
"Perfect" became Simple Plan's biggest hit on the US Billboard Hot 100, peaking at number 24. It was also a top-10 hit in Australia, peaking at number six, and reached number 14 in New Zealand. In 2005, the song become band's first top-10 single on the Canadian Singles Chart, peaking at number five.

Music video
In the music video of the single, directed by Liz Friedlander, the band are playing on the roof of a house. Throughout the video, it shows how teens are trying to escape such pressure by letting everything out and realizing that they cannot keep their pain in any longer.

Track listing
Standard CD single
 "Perfect" (radio version)
 "Perfect" (acoustic)
 "Happy Together"

Charts

Weekly charts

Year-end charts

Certifications

Release history

References

2002 songs
2003 singles
Emo songs
Lava Records singles
Music videos directed by Liz Friedlander
Rock ballads
Simple Plan songs